Todo Tiene Su Hora Tour is a world tour by Dominican singer Juan Luis Guerra, in support of the studio album Todo Tiene su hora.

Tour Dates

Box office data

Notes

References 

2015 concert tours
2016 concert tours
2017 concert tours
Juan Luis Guerra